In mathematics, Abel–Goncharov interpolation determines a polynomial such that various higher derivatives are the same as those of a given function at given points.

References

Interpolation